Potassium channel subfamily T, member 1, also known as KCNT1 is a human gene that encodes the KCa4.1 protein. KCa4.1 is a member of the calcium-activated potassium channel protein family

Associated Conditions

Mutations in the KCNT1 gene has been shown to be a cause of Early Infantile Epileptic Encephalopathy.

See also 
 SK channel
 Voltage-gated potassium channel

References

Further reading

Ion channels